The Semipalatinsk Oblast was an oblast (province) of the Russian Empire and the early Russian SFSR. From 1882 to 1917 it was part of the Governor-Generalship of the Steppes. It roughly corresponded to most of present-day northeastern Kazakhstan. It was created out of the territories of the former Kazakh Khanate. The first Russian settlement in the area dates from 1718, when Russia built a fort beside the river Irtysh, near the ruins of an ancient Buddhist monastery, where seven buildings could be seen. The fort (and later the city) was named Semipalatinsk (Russian for "Seven-Chambered City") after the monastery. The city is now known as Semey.

Demographics
As of 1897, 684,590 people populated the oblast. Kazakhs constituted the majority of the population. Significant minorities consisted of Russians and Tatars. Total Turkic speaking were 614,999(89,8%).

Ethnic groups in 1897

Source:

References

Oblasts of the Russian Empire
Kazakhstan in the Russian Empire